Stellar Into the World is the third and final extended play (EP) by South Korean girl group Stellar. It was released on June 27, 2017, by The Entertainment Pascal and distributed by Genie Music. This marks the only release as a five-member group, with the addition of member Soyoung in May 2017, and the departure of members Jeonyul and Gayoung in August 2017.

This was Stellar's final release before their disbandment in 2018.

Background and release 
On December 26, 2016, the group began a fundraising event through Makestar in order to finance their next album. The project reached its original goal on the first day before going on to achieve 1132% of its original target by its end in April 2017. This was the group's third Makestar project.

Stellar Into the World was digitally released on June 27, 2017, through several music portals, including MelOn, and iTunes, for the global market. The EP was expected to be released physically a day later, but due to production problems, was not released as a CD until July 13, 2017. The physical CD comes in two versions, a white "Tree of Sephiroth" version and a black "Tree of Qliphoth" version. Both versions contain a random photocard of one of the members for fans to collect.

Promotion 
The group held their first "comeback stage" on SBS MTV's The Show on June 27, 2017, performing their title track. They continued on MBC Music's Show Champion on June 28. They went on to perform on all the major music shows as well as promoting on shows such as Pops in Seoul, Simply K-Pop, Fact In Star and Celuv TV.

Single 
"'Archangels of the Sephiroth" was released as the title track in conjunction with the EP on June 27. A music video teaser was released on June 25. The official music video was released on June 27, through Genie Music official YouTube channel.

Commercial performance 
Stellar Into the World debuted at number 19 on the Gaon Album Chart, on the chart issue dated July 9–15, 2017. They later climbed to number 17. The EP also debuted and peaked at number 13 on the US World Albums chart, on the week ending July 15, 2017.

Track listing

Charts

Release history

References 

2017 EPs
Stellar (South Korean band) albums